Stutee Ghosh is an Indian film critic, political satirist, writer, and award winning Radio personality who works for The quint digital media limited from New Delhi, India. She is also a celeb chatshow host with Hindustan Times Digital.

Career 
While doing her post graduation in english literature from Delhi University, she started working as a radio host with Fever 104fm and film criticism with The Quint.

Awards 

 She won the India radio forum best Rj award

References

External links 

 Stutee Ghosh on Twitter
 Stutee Ghosh on Instagram
 Stutee Ghosh on Rotten Tomatoes

Living people
Indian film critics
Indian radio personalities
Year of birth missing (living people)
Delhi University alumni